Hatun Suyu Q'asa (Quechua hatun big, suyu region, q'asa mountain pass, "big region pass", also spelled Jatunsuyocasa) is a mountain in the Andes of Peru, about  high. It is located in the Cusco Region, Calca Province, on the border of the districts of Coya and Lamay. It lies southeast of Lamay between the Willkapampa valley and the Yanamayu ("black river", Yanamayo).

References 

Mountains of Peru
Mountains of Cusco Region